Kuteh (also Romanized as Kūteh; also known as Kūteh-ye Pā’īn) is a village in Taftan-e Jonubi Rural District, Nukabad District, Khash County, Sistan and Baluchestan Province, Iran. At the 2006 census, its population was 921, in 173 families.

References 

Populated places in Khash County